House at 10th and Avery Streets is a historic home located at Parkersburg, Wood County, West Virginia. It was built between about 1860 and 1879, and is a two-story, frame house in the Eastlake / Carpenter Gothic style. Its roof has a complex composition of hips and gabled wall dormers, pierced by two brick chimney.  The house features sawn woodwork that make it the most highly ornamented residential building in downtown Parkersburg.

It was listed on the National Register of Historic Places in 1982.

References

Houses in Parkersburg, West Virginia
Houses on the National Register of Historic Places in West Virginia
Houses completed in 1879
Stick-Eastlake architecture in West Virginia
Carpenter Gothic architecture in West Virginia
Carpenter Gothic houses in the United States
National Register of Historic Places in Wood County, West Virginia